Raúl Fuentes Cuenca (born February 9, 1975) is a Spanish pop singer known by his stage name Raúl. In 2000 he participated in the Spanish national final for the Eurovision Song Contest 2000 with his song "Sueño su boca" finishing second. Since he has published several albums. In 2014 he participated in the Spanish national final for the Eurovision Song Contest 2014 with the song "Seguir sin ti", finishing fourth.

Discography

Studio albums
 2000 – Sueño su boca No. 1 Spain
 2001 – Haciendo trampas
 2003 – As de corazones
 2005 – Ya no es ayer
 2007 – Una vida
 2011 – Contramarea

Other albums
 2000 – Remixes y Unplugged
 2003 – As de corazones remixes

References

External links
Official website

1975 births
Living people
Basque musicians
People from Vitoria-Gasteiz
Spanish pop singers
Latin pop singers
21st-century Spanish singers
21st-century Spanish male singers